Karaf Chal (also Romanized as Karaf Chāl) is a village in Khorgam Rural District, Khorgam District, Rudbar County, Gilan Province, Iran. At the 2006 census, its population was 16, in 6 families.

References 

Populated places in Rudbar County